The mayor of Pazardzhik is the head of the Pazardzhik Municipality. The current title holder is Todor Popov, who has been mayor since 4 November 2007 and currently in his fourth mandate.

List of mayors of Pazardzhik

References 

Lists of mayors of places in Bulgaria